Moteng is a community council located in the Butha-Buthe District of Lesotho. Its population in 2006 was 16,838.

Villages
The community of 'Moteng includes the villages of Bela-Bela, Boinyatso, Bokong (Khaphamali), Ha Hlakacha, Ha Khanye, Ha Lelala, Ha Lesiba, Ha Machefu, Ha Maieane, Ha Matela, Ha Moiloa, Ha Mokone, Ha Molapo, Ha Molumo, Ha Motapane, Ha Moteoli, Ha Mpotla, Ha Nkota, Ha Phakela, Ha Potomane, Ha Ramahotetsa, Ha Sekete (Paballong), Ha Taetsi, Ha Tlebere, Ha Tsolonyane, Khalikana, Khatleng, Khorong, Khubetsoana, Kolone, Lekhalong, Letsoana, Linotšing, Luma, Machubilane, Maholeng, Makareng, Makeneng, Marabeng, Marati, Maseru (Moteng), Mashapi, Masianokeng, Masoleng, Matebeleng, Mathebe, Mota Rifa, Motahane, Muela, Naleli, Nchekoane, Nyakoaneng, Ordendal, Palehong, Phahameng, Phahleng, Phatlalla, Phelandaba, Phohlane, Phomolong, Pote, Qobella, Sebataolong,
Sentelina, Setlakalleng and Thabana-Tšooana.

References

External links
 Google map of community villages

Populated places in Butha-Buthe District